The N Class are a class of diesel locomotives built by Clyde Engineering, Somerton for V/Line between 1985 and 1987.

History

By the start of the 1980s, Victorian Railways passenger numbers had fallen to around 3 million per year, due to ageing rolling stock, stagnant timetables and competition from other forms of transport. The Lonie Report of 1980 recommended cuts to the network, with the general public responding by calling for the State Government to maintain a viable rail network. The government response in February 1981 was the New Deal for Country Passengers, a $115 million commitment to recast country rail passenger services in Victoria.

As part of the New Deal, all B class locomotives were to be re-built as the A class for use on passenger services and ten new locomotives ordered. Tenders closed in 1983 for the first 10 units, with Clyde Engineering being awarded the contract. By mid-1985, the rising cost of the A class conversions saw the project abandoned after 11 locomotives were completed, and the N class order increased to 25 using the parts intended for the A class conversions.

As well as being operated by V/Line, class members were hired to the Warrnambool line operator West Coast Railway from 1993 until its own locomotives became available in 1995, and to Shepparton line operator Hoys Roadlines between 1993 and 2004.

In preparation for privatisation, the operations of V/Line Freight and V/Line Passenger were split in 1995, with the N class allocated to the passenger operator and included in the sale to National Express in 1999.

During the Regional Fast Rail project, a number of shutdowns were carried out to normal passenger services, with the N class being used to haul ballast trains on the Geelong line in 2003/04, as well as being hired to Freight Australia in January 2004 to haul log and grain services. Since 2007 class members have also been hired to heritage operator Seymour Railway Heritage Centre for use on its trains, as the provision of TPWS equipment permits running at full line speed over the Regional Fast Rail network.

Today, with the VLocity diesel multiple units having entered service, the N class play a lesser role, their main use being peak-time commuter services to Bacchus Marsh and Geelong, along with long-distance services beyond the Regional Fast Rail network to Bairnsdale, Swan Hill, and Warrnambool. A standard-gauge variation of the class formerly ran to Albury, though these trains where replaced by a standard gauge Vlocity, with the last standard gauge N class service running on 30 July 2022. As of 1 June 2020, all engines had been fitted with the upgraded traction motors.

Features
The N class feature a frame and body locally designed, but with imported Electro-Motive Division technology in the prime mover, generator and control unit, along with locally produced components such as the bogie frames by Bradken. The class was the first in the world to use the EMD D43 traction motor, similar to but smaller than that used in the C and G classes. Head end power is provided by a separate engine unit in a special compartment located at the number 1 end of the locomotive behind the electrical cabinet. The 240 kW generator provides 415 V 3-phase AC power for train lighting, air conditioning and other carriage requirements.

Fitted with 6,800-litre fuel tanks, the class were capable of running from Melbourne to Adelaide without refuelling. Electrical and electronic components are modular to minimise delays after failures, and a reactive muffler system reduces the exhaust noise level.

The narrow carbody provides for a catwalk along each side between the cabs, with foldback body panels for maintenance access. The cab is similar to that of the contemporary G class, with an anti-climber beam to prevent upward movement should a collision occur. Twin high impact windscreens are provided, with dual blade wipers. Each cab has room for a two-person crew, as well as an instructor if required. Air conditioning is provided, as well as an air-operated retention toilet at one end accessible from the catwalk. The locos were initially provided with automatic staff exchange equipment, but this was removed in the 1990s when the use of Electric Staff ended. The space remains in the cab side today.

The carbody design was the basis of one-off locomotive GML10 built by Clyde Engineering in 1990.

Livery
The N class were delivered in the V/Line tangerine orange and grey livery, and progressively named after cities in Victoria, except for N453 which is named after the City of Albury on the other side of the Victorian/New South Wales border. The N class is, therefore, one of only three Australian locomotives where every class member is named. N465 carries an earlier spelling of the city now Ballarat, originally Ballaarat. On 3 March 1987 locomotive N470 was returned to Clyde Engineering, Somerton for a ceremony, where brass plaques were affixed at both ends under the builder's plates, reading "N470 completing one million horsepower of diesel-electric locomotives built in Australia by Clyde Engineering Co".

From 1995, the class members were repainted into a red and blue livery, with the V/Line logo on the side being altered after the privatisation of V/Line in 1999. As of 2008, most N Class members have received white stripes along the cab-fronts, and cowcatchers painted yellow to increase visibility at level crossings in a program started in 2007.

In May 2008, locomotive N468 was repainted into the new V/Line livery of red with grey, white and yellow.

On 8 April 2017, N457 made its first revenue run to Albury in a new PTV livery of Purple and Yellow. This follows the painting of Set SN 8 into the new livery to match the V/Locity fleet and the wider fleet of Victorian trams and buses.

Locomotives

Gallery

References

External links

Clyde Engineering locomotives
Co-Co locomotives
Railway locomotives introduced in 1985
N class
Standard gauge locomotives of Australia
Broad gauge locomotives in Australia
Diesel-electric locomotives of Australia